The stareye lightfish (Pollichthys mauli) is a species in the monotypic genus of Pollichthys.
They are small stomiiform fishes found in oceans throughout the world. The maximum length is 6 cm.

Etymology
The genus is named after the Belgian ichthyologist Max Poll who described the species in 1953, originally placing it in the genus Yarrella. The species is named after Günther Maul.

References

External links
 Pollichthys mauli (Poll, 1953) Taxonomic Serial No.: 162189 - Integrated Taxonomic Information System
 Genus: Pollichthys - Global Biodiversity Information Facility
 Pollichthys (Genus) - zipcodezoo.com

Phosichthyidae
Taxa named by Max Poll
Fish described in 1953